Beaverhill Lake is a large lake in central Alberta, Canada. It is a site of regional importance in the Western Hemisphere Shorebird Reserve Network. It is managed by the Canadian Wildlife Service division of Environment Canada.

It is located 70 km southeast of Edmonton, near the town of Tofield, and lies in the hydrographic basin of the North Saskatchewan River.

The lake is an important bird habitat and has been designated as a "National Nature Viewpoint" by Nature Canada (formerly known as the Canadian Nature Federation) in 1981. The Beaverhill Natural Area was established in 1987 to protect the lake and its surrounding area. Beaverhill Lake Heritage Rangeland Natural Area is also established on what were the shores of the lake.

The Beaverhill Lake Group, a stratigraphical unit of the Western Canadian Sedimentary Basin was named for this lake.

References

Beaver County, Alberta
Lakes of Alberta
Lamont County
Ramsar sites in Canada